Ellis Kane Plummer (born 2 September 1994) is an English retired footballer who played as a defender. He began his career at Manchester City, but never made an appearance for the club. During his time there he had loan spells with Oldham Athletic and St Mirren. After leaving Manchester City in 2017, Plummer played for Motherwell. In September 2019, he announced his retirement from football due to injury.

Career

Manchester City
Starting his academy training at Stockport County, Plummer joined Manchester City at the age of 11 in 2006. After graduating to Manchester City's Elite Development Squad, he gained his first senior-level experience with a loan to League One side Oldham Athletic. During his 2012–13 season Plummer was nominated for the Academy Player of the Year award as recognition for his impressive form both at home, and in Europe. After being loaned out on 28 November 2013, he was placed in the starting line-up for Oldham's game on 1 December, playing 64 minutes before being substituted to prevent him from risking a second yellow card for persistent fouling.

Plummer was released by Manchester City after the 2016–17 season, having not played a game for the first team.

St Mirren (loan)
On 2 July 2014, it was announced that Plummer had signed for Scottish Premiership club, St Mirren, on a one-year loan deal. Plummer was restricted to just seven appearances for Saints due to injuries, and as such his one-year loan was cut short on 2 January 2015.

Motherwell
Plummer joined Motherwell on 2 August 2017 on a 1-year deal. He was released by Motherwell at the end of his contract.

Retirement
On his 25th birthday, 2 September 2019, Plummer announced that he had been forced into retirement after battling with injuries for several years. He moved into business with his own clothing company.

Career statistics

References

External links

1994 births
Living people
Association football defenders
Manchester City F.C. players
Oldham Athletic A.F.C. players
St Mirren F.C. players
Motherwell F.C. players
English Football League players
English footballers
Scottish Professional Football League players
England youth international footballers
Black British sportspeople
People from Audenshaw
Footballers from Greater Manchester